Maroochy Barambah is an Australian Aboriginal mezzo-soprano singer. She is a song-woman, law-woman and elder of the Turrbal people.

Early life
She was born Yvette Isaacs in the 1950s in Cherbourg, Queensland. She is of the Turrbal-Gubbi Gubbi people and is a member of the Stolen Generations. She considers herself a beneficiary of her removal. As a tribute to her Aboriginality she took the names Maroochy (meaning "black swan") and Barambah (meaning "source of the western wind").

Career
Maroochy Barambah rose to fame for her part in the 1989 Sydney Metropolitan Opera production of Black River, by Julianne Schultz and Andrew Schultz, an opera about black deaths in custody, and later starring in the 1993 film adaption which was awarded the Grand-Prix, Opera Screen at Opera Bastille, Paris. She also has appeared in the indigenous musical Bran Nue Dae, the 1981 television series Women of the Sun and in the opera Beach Dreaming (written for and about her by Mark Isaacs).

She has released two singles, one of which, "Aborigine", reached the top 10 on the U.S. Billboard Dance chart.

She performed at the 1993 AFL Grand Final, singing Waltzing Matilda and Advance Australia Fair. Her performance was criticized by many as she sang out of tune and missed an entire verse.

Maroochy's translation of Advance Australia Fair into Turrubul, the native language of the Aborigines of the Brisbane region, was performed at the 2013 Indigenous All Stars Rugby League match at Suncorp Stadium, Brisbane, on 9 February 2013.

On 15 November 2014, Maroochy featured in the Welcome to Country ceremony at the formal opening of the 2014 G-20 Australia Summit, held in Brisbane, Australia, performing in front of national leaders and international dignitaries.

Discography

Albums

Singles

Appears on
Women of the sun (1981) miniseries
Black River (1997) soundtrack - MusicArtsDance Films

References

1950s births
Living people
Indigenous Australian musicians
Australian mezzo-sopranos
20th-century Australian women opera singers
Members of the Stolen Generations
Operatic mezzo-sopranos